Saint Margaret of England  (died 1192) was born in Hungary to an Englishwoman who was related to Thomas Becket, the murdered Archbishop of Canterbury.

When she was grown, Margaret took her mother with her on a pilgrimage to Jerusalem and they then settled in Bethlehem, where they lived austere lives of penance. Her mother died there in the Holy Land. After that Margaret made pilgrimages to the Virgin of Montserrat in Spain, and then to Our Lady of Le Puy in Le Puy-en-Velay, in the Auvergne region of France.

She then became a Cistercian nun at the Abbey of Sauvebénite near Le Puy, where she died. Miracles were reported at her tomb and it became a pilgrimage site. Margaret's feast day is observed on 3 February.

References
Farmer, David Hugh. (1978). The Oxford Dictionary of Saints. Oxford: Oxford University Press.

External links
St. Margaret of England - Catholic Online

1192 deaths
12th-century Christian saints
12th-century Hungarian nuns
12th-century French nuns
Cistercian nuns
Cistercian saints
Hungarian Cistercians
Hungarian emigrants to France
Hungarian people of British descent
Medieval Hungarian saints
Medieval French saints
Miracle workers
Year of birth unknown
Female saints of medieval Hungary
Female saints of medieval France